The Conservative People's Party also known as  was a small Czech Catholic political party in Bohemia. The party was founded in the 1910s after split in the Catholic-National Conservative Party in Bohemia and the Party of the Catholic People. In January 1919 members united under František Šabata and party merged into newly formed Czechoslovak People's Party.

References

Political parties disestablished in 1919
Catholic political parties
Political parties in Austria-Hungary
Defunct Christian political parties